Hermaeus Soter or Hermaios Soter (epithet means "the Saviour") was a Western Indo-Greek king of the Eucratid Dynasty, who ruled the territory of Paropamisade in the Hindu-Kush region, with his capital in Alexandria of the Caucasus (near today's Kabul, Afghanistan). Bopearachchi dates Hermaeus to c. 90–70 BCE and R. C. Senior to c. 95–80 BCE.

Biography

Hermaeus seems to have been successor of Philoxenus or Diomedes, and his wife Kalliope may have been a daughter of Philoxenus, according to Senior. Judging from his coins, Hermaeus' rule was long and prosperous, but came to an end when the Yuezhi, coming from neighbouring Bactria, overran most of his Greek kingdom in the Paropamisade around 70 BCE. According to Bopearachchi, these nomads were the Yuezhi, the ancestors of the Kushans, whereas Senior considers them Sakas.

Kushan ruler Kujula Kadphises associated himself to Hermaeus on his coins, either in attempt to solidify legitimacy or due to the difficulties minting early coins. In any case, the Yuezhi-Kushans preserved a close cultural interaction with the Greeks as late as the 3rd century CE.

Given the importance of Hermaeus to the nomad rulers, it is possible that Hermaeus himself was partially of nomad origin.

Coins of Hermaeus

Hermaeus issued Indian silver coins of three types. The first type has a diademed or sometimes helmeted portrait, with reverse of sitting Zeus making benediction gesture. Hermaeus also issued a rare series of Attic silver tetradrachms of this type, which were issued for export to Bactria.

The second type was a joint series of Hermaeus with his queen Kalliope. The reverse departs from the traditional Hermaeus format, in that it shows the king on a prancing horse. The "king on a prancing horse" is characteristic of the contemporary Greek kings in the eastern Punjab such as Hippostratos, and it has been suggested that the coin represented a marital alliance between the two dynastic lines. The horseman on Hermaeus' version is however portrayed somewhat different, being equipped with a typical Scythian longbow.

The third series combined the reverses of the first series, without portrait.

Hermaeus also issued bronze coins with the head of Zeus-Mithras and a prancing horse on the reverse.

Contacts with China

A Chinese historical record from the Hanshu Chap. 96A could possible be related to Hermaeus, even though this is very speculative and the record more likely refers to later Saka kings. The chronicle tells how a king who may possibly be identified as Hermaeus received the support of the Chinese against Indo-Scythian occupants, and may explain why his kingdom was suddenly so prosperous despite the general decline of the Indo-Greeks during the period. The Chinese records would put Hermaeus's dates later, with his reign ending around 40 BCE.

According to the Hanshu, Chap. 96A, Wutoulao (Spalirises?), king of Jibin (Kophen, upper Kabul Valley), killed some Chinese envoys. After the death of the king, his son (Spaladagames) sent an envoy to China with gifts. The Chinese general Wen Zhong, commander of the border area in western Gansu, accompanied the escort back. Wutoulao's son plotted to kill Wen Zhong. When Wen Zhong discovered the plot, he allied himself with Yinmofu (Hermaeus?), "son of the king of Rongqu" (Yonaka, the Greeks). They attacked Jibin (possibly with the support of the Yuezhi, themselves allies of the Chinese since around 100 BCE according to the Hanshu) and killed Wutoulao's son. Yinmofu (Hermaeus?) was then installed as king of Jibin, as a vassal of the Chinese Empire, and receiving the Chinese seal and ribbon of investiture.

Later Yinmofu (Hermaeus?) himself is recorded to have killed Chinese envoys in the reign of Emperor Yuandi (48–33 BCE), then sent envoys to apologize to the Chinese court, but he was disregarded. During the reign of Emperor Chengdi (51–7 BCE) other envoys were sent, but they were rejected as simple traders.

Imitations by Indo-Scythian and Yuezhi invaders

These events may have initiated an alliance between the Greeks and the Yuezhi (even possibly a dynastic alliance), explaining why the Yuezhi gained pre-eminence after the reign of Hermaeus, why their rulers such as Heraios then minted coins in a way very faithful to the Greek type, and why the first Kushan emperor Kujula Kadphises associated himself with Hermaeus on his coins, in a way characteristic of a ruler asserting his pedigree.

Gallery

See also
 Greco-Bactrian Kingdom
 Seleucid Empire
 Greco-Buddhism
 Indo-Scythians
 Indo-Parthian Kingdom
 Kushan Empire

References

Sources
 The Greeks in Bactria and India, W. W. Tarn, Cambridge University Press.
 The Coin Types of the Indo-Greek Kings, 256-54 B.C., A. K. Narain
 China in Central Asia, the Early Stage: 125 B.C.-A.D. 23: an annotated translation of chapters 61 and 96 of the History of the Former Han Dynasty, A. F. P. Hulsewé, and M. A. N. Loewe, 1979. Leiden: E. J. Brill.

External links
Coins of Hermaeus
More coins of Hermaeus

Herm
Herm